Xenomycetes is a genus of handsome fungus beetles in the family Endomychidae. It is the only genus in the subfamily Xenomycetinae. There are at least two described species in Xenomycetes, both endemic to northwestern North America.

Species
These two species belong to the genus Xenomycetes:
 Xenomycetes laversi Hatch, 1962 i c g
 Xenomycetes morrisoni Horn, 1880 i c g b
Data sources: i = ITIS, c = Catalogue of Life, g = GBIF, b = Bugguide.net

References

Further reading

 
 
 
 

Endomychidae
Articles created by Qbugbot
Coccinelloidea genera